Fernando "Nando" dalla Chiesa (born 3 November 1949) is an Italian academic and politician, honorary president of Libera, former Deputy and Senator.

Biography 
Dalla Chiesa is the son of general Carlo Alberto dalla Chiesa, notable for campaigning against terrorism, and brother of TV presenter Rita dalla Chiesa and journalist and politician Simona dalla Chiesa. His father was assassinated in 1982 together with his wife, Emanuela Setti Carraro.

Dalla Chiesa graduated in economics at the Bocconi University in Milan and became a University professor of Sociology of organized crime, Business management and communication and Sociology of the organization at the University of Milan. He is as well honorary president of Luigi Ciotti's Libera association.

Political career 
In 1992, dalla Chiesa joined Leoluca Orlando's new-born left-wing party The Network, with which he is elected at the Chamber of Deputies in occasion of the 1992 general election.

In 1993, in the local elections of that year, dalla Chiesa ran for the office of Mayor of Milan, supported by his party, by the Democratic Party of the Left, the Communist Refoundation Party and the Federation of the Greens. dalla Chiesa manages to reach the runoff, but is defeated by the Northern League candidate Marco Formentini.

Dalla Chiesa is not re-elected at the Chamber in the 1994 election and decides to leave The Network. He manages to return to the Chamber of Deputies in the 1996 election, getting elected as an independent in the Federation of the Greens with the support of The Olive Tree coalition.

When in 1998 the D'Alema I Cabinet swore in, dalla Chiesa refrained from voting for trust since the government was supported also by Francesco Cossiga with whom dalla Chiesa had a bad relationship, since he accused the former President of Italy of raising many malevolences against his father when Carlo Alberto dalla Chiesa was Prefect in Palermo.

In 2000 he became the coordinator in Lombardy of Arturo Parisi's The Democrats and in the 2001 election dalla Chiesa is elected to the Senate. In 2002, The Democrats and the Italian People's Party converged into The Daisy.

Dalla Chiesa didn't run again for a parliamentary seat in the 2006 election, but after the win of The Union he is appointed Undersecretary for Universities and Scientific Research in the Prodi II Cabinet. In 2007, dalla Chiesa has been a member of the National Direction of the Democratic Party.

Writing career 
Dalla Chiesa wrote several books and essays about politics and fight against organized crime in Italy. Among his most known works, there is the 1992 book Il giudice ragazzino (The Boy Judge, a tributary essay dedicated to Rosario Livatino, a young Sicilian judge who has been murdered by the Mafia in 1990. In telling the experience and the tragic end of Livatino, dalla Chiesa reconstructs his vision of the connection between the Mafia, politics and institutions in Sicily and Italy in the late 1980s, indicating the murder of the judge as one of the highest triumphs of criminal powers.

The 1994 film Law of Courage is based on dalla Chiesa's book.

Electoral history

First-past-the-post elections

References

External links 
Official website
Files about his parliamentary activities (in Italian): XI, XIII, XIV legislature.

1949 births
Living people
Politicians from Florence
The Network (political party) politicians
The Democrats (Italy) politicians
Democracy is Freedom – The Daisy politicians
Deputies of Legislature XI of Italy
Deputies of Legislature XIII of Italy
Senators of Legislature XIV of Italy
Bocconi University alumni
Academic staff of the University of Milan